Erin Springs is a town in Garvin County, Oklahoma, United States. The population was 87 at the 2010 census, a decline of 23.7 percent from the figure of 114 in 2000.

History
The town began in 1871, when Frank Murray, an Irish immigrant from Londonderry, built a home at this location. He later became a large landowner and cattle rancher, owning  of land and 26,000 head of cattle. The community was initially known as Elm Springs, for a large elm tree that grew behind the stage depot.

Elm Springs was renamed Erin Springs, in honor of Frank Murray's sister, Erin Westland.

Geography
Erin Springs is located at  (34.813220, −97.603462).

Demographics

As of the census of 2010, there were 87 people, 36 households, and 25 families residing in the town. There were 41 housing units at an average density of 288.4 per square mile (111.3/km2). The racial makeup of the town was 88.5% White, 4.6% Native American, 1.1% from Asian, and 5.7% from two or more races.

There were 36 households, out of which 19.4% had children under the age of 18 living with them, 55.6% were married couples living together, 8.3% had a female householder with no husband present, and 30.6% were non-families. A quarter of the households (25%) were made up of individuals, and 16.7% had someone living alone who was 65 years of age or older.  The average household size was 2.42 and the average family size was 2.88.

In the town, the population was spread out, with 26.3% under the age of 18, 6.1% from 18 to 24, 21.9% from 25 to 44, 26.3% from 45 to 64, and 17.2% who were 65 years of age or older.  The median age was 41.5 years.  For every 100 females, there were 83.9 males. For every 100 females age 18 and over, there were 82.6 males.

The median income for a household in the town was $43,125, and the median income for a family was $18,929.  Males had a median income of $65,875 versus $14,883 for females.  The per capita income for the town was $25,600.  Almost half (46.3%) of the population and 47.8% of families were below the poverty line.

References

Towns in Garvin County, Oklahoma
Towns in Oklahoma